The Urban Studies Foundation is a Scottish research charity connected with the Urban Studies Journal. The organization's stated purpose is to provide grant funding for innovative research projects that advance the frontiers of urban knowledge as part of the broader discipline of urban studies. With origins in an academic journal, it is therefore similar to the IJURR Foundation and Antipode Foundation.

The USF currently provides grant funding globally to both post-doctoral research fellows, and scholars who wish to organize seminar series on themes relating to contemporary topics in urban research. It also has grants aimed specifically at researchers from the Global South.

References

Charities based in Glasgow